The Dijon Exhibition took place in the former Palace of the Dukes of Burgundy, Place du Théâtre and the Place d'Armes and exhibited Agriculture, fine arts, and industry.

There were 120 000 visitors.

Timeline

At the end of 1857 the permanent Society of Friends of Dijon arts decided to hold an arts, industry and agriculture exhibition. 
On 7 January 1858 the Dijon municipality examined its feasibility and added the Côte-d'Or horticulture society and presidents of music companies.
The Cote D'or prefect approved the project on 16 January.
The fair opened on 8 July after being deferred from 1 June.

Personnel

The director was Par J Soubie.

Marcellin Jobard, director of the  industry chaired the food substances (the 11th class of exhibits) jury, with Edouard de la Loyere, chairman of the agriculture and viticulture committee of the borough of Beaune vice-president. A Medal of Honour was awarded to Jules Bessy, cereal trader in Chalon-sur-Saône.

References

1858 in France
History of Dijon
World's fairs in France